Yunmeng County is a county in eastern Hubei province, People's Republic of China. It is administered by Xiaogan City and is located just outside Xiaogan's urban area.

History

During the Spring and Autumn period of Chinese history (770-476 BCE), Yunmeng County formed part of the Zhou Dynasty vassal State of Yun, later annexed by the State of Chu whose kings used the area as a hunting ground.
After Chu's defeat at the hands of the State of Qin in 223 BCE, Yunmeng became part of Qin territory. Legend suggests that China's first emperor Qin Shi Huang visited the county in 219 BCE. 
Yunmeng was the location of the Jiangxia Commandery of the Han Dynasty and the cradle of the Chinese Huang Clan.

Administrative divisions

Towns:
Chengguan, Yitang, Zengdian, Wupu, Wuluo, Xiaxindian, Daoqiao, Geputan, Hujindian

Townships:
Daodian Township, Shahe Township, Qingminghe Township

Other area:
Yunmeng County Economic Development Area

Climate

Culture
Yumian, is a local specialty noodle made with flour and fish from the Fu River in Yunmeng. Yunmeng Yumian was awarded silver medal of The first Panama–Pacific International Exposition in 1915.

Notable people
Dou Ziwen
Huang Xiang
Zhao Fu
Zou Guanguang
Xu Zhaochun
Wu Luzhen

External links
Official website of the Yunmeng County Government

References 

Counties of Hubei
Xiaogan